Chelis glaphyra is a moth in the family Erebidae. It was described by Eduard Friedrich Eversmann in 1843. It is found in eastern Kazakhstan, Kyrgyzstan, the central Tien Shan and China (Xinjiang).

This species was moved from the genus Palearctia to Chelis as a result of phylogenetic research published in 2016.

Subspecies
 Chelis glaphyra glaphyra (eastern Kazakhstan)
 Chelis glaphyra aksuensis O. Bang-Haas, 1927 (Kyrgyzstan, China: Xinjiang)
 Chelis glaphyra dublitzkyi (O.Bang-Haas, 1927) (Kazakhstan, Kyrgyzstan)
 Chelis glaphyra manni (Staudinger, 1881) (north-eastern Tien Shan)

References

Moths described in 1843
Arctiina